In anatomy, anterior refers to the front of the individual.

Anterior may also refer to:
Anterior (phonetics), a category of speech sounds
Anterior (band), a Welsh metal band
Anterior tense, a relative past tense